The 6.5mm Creedmoor (6.5×48 mm), designated 6.5 Creedmoor by SAAMI, 6.5 Creedmoor by the C.I.P. or 6.5 CM or 6.5 CRDMR for short, is a centerfire rifle cartridge introduced by Hornady in 2007. It was developed by Hornady senior ballistics scientist Dave Emary in partnership with Dennis DeMille, the vice-president of product development at Creedmoor Sports, hence the name.  The cartridge is a necked-down modification of the .30 Thompson Center.

The 6.5mm Creedmoor was designed specifically for long-range target shooting, although it has been used successfully in game hunting. Bullet-for-bullet, the 6.5mm Creedmoor achieves a slower muzzle velocity than longer cartridges such as the 6.5-284 Norma or magnum cartridges such as the 6.5mm Remington Magnum.

Design considerations
In general, 6.5 mm (.264 in) bullets are known for their high sectional density and ballistic coefficients, and often have been used successfully in rifle competitions. 
The 6.5mm Creedmoor was designed for target shooting at longer ranges, and as such, couples a sensible case volume (3.40 ml) to bore area (34.66 mm2/0.3466 cm2) ratio with ample space for loading long slender projectiles providing good aerodynamic efficiency and external ballistic performance for the projectile diameter.
For some loads, the 6.5mm Creedmoor is capable of duplicating the muzzle velocity or trajectory of the .300 Winchester Magnum while generating significantly-lower recoil, based on lighter projectile weight.

Cartridge dimensions
The 6.5mm Creedmoor has 3.40 ml (52.5 grains H2O) cartridge case capacity.

6.5mm Creedmoor  maximum C.I.P. cartridge dimensions. All sizes in millimeters (mm).

Americans define the shoulder angle at alpha/2 = 30 degrees. The common rifling twist rate for this cartridge is 203 mm (1 in 8 in), 6 grooves, Ø lands = , Ø grooves = , land width = , and the primer type is large rifle or small rifle depending on the cartridge case manufacturer.

According to the official C.I.P. (Commission Internationale Permanente pour l'Epreuve des Armes à Feu Portatives) rulings, 6.5mm Creedmoor can handle up to  Pmax piezo pressure. In C.I.P. regulated countries, every rifle cartridge combo has to be proofed at 125% of this maximum C.I.P. pressure to certify for sale to consumers.
In CIP-regulated areas, 6.5mm Creedmoor  chambered arms are proof-tested at  PE piezo pressure.

The SAAMI Maximum Average Pressure (MAP) for this cartridge is  piezo pressure

Performance
The 6.5mm Creedmoor is a medium-power cartridge comparable to the .260 Remington and 6.5×47mm Lapua.
6.5mm Creedmoor can provide sub-half-minute of angle accuracy from factory ammo.

A semiautomatic sniper rifle with a 20-inch barrel, in 6.5mm Creedmoor, is capable of engaging military targets from point blank range to 1,100 meters.

Handloading

Handloading costs for the 6.5mm Creedmoor are roughly-equivalent to other 6.5 mm cartridges, such as the 6.5×47mm Lapua, due to the availability of Lapua small primer brass for both cartridges. As of January 2020 Lapua is also manufacturing 6.5 Creedmoor brass with large rifle primers. Norma makes brass for the cartridge, and Norma brass is available through several major-retailers at approximately the same cost as Lapua brass. Lapua brass for 6.5×47 lasts for about 12-to-20 reloads. Starline sells brass cases with either large or small primer pockets, with small pocket brass costing slightly more.

After the 6.5mm Creedmoor was introduced, it was advertised as a 60,000 psi capable case. However, after it was placed into production, Hornady listed it as 62,000 psi, then registered it with SAAMI as such. For this reason, many hand loaders have poor experiences reloading for it. Blown primers on the first shot at 62,000 psi are not uncommon. Early shooting articles listed the ammo as loaded to 58,000 psi, but later citings list it as 57,000 psi. Hornady reduced the loads in its factory ammo because of complaints it was often blowing primers.

Lapua delivered 6.5mm Creedmoor brass at Shot show 2017, and production quantities became available via major retailers in second quarter 2017. The Lapua version has a small primer pocket. Thus, load data for small-primer brass are not interchangeable with those for large-primer brass. A smaller diameter decapping rod is required to size and decap. As of January 2020 Lapua also manufactures its brass with large rifle primers addressing concerns that some small rifle primers may not efficiently ignite the powder charge in cold weather conditions causing hang fires or misfires. Large rifle primer Lapua brass also allows the use of a standard size decapping rod.

The 6.5mm Creedmoor as parent case

The 6mm Creedmoor is a necked-down version of the 6.5mm Creedmoor using 6 mm (.243 inch) bullets, lighter than 6.5 mm bullets with similarly-reduced recoil. John Snow at Outdoor Life built a 6mm Creedmoor rifle in 2009 for a magazine article of the wildcat cartridge that appeared in 2010, but the first documented conception of the 6mm Creedmoor was by Lee Gardner, a Snipershide forum user in May 2009. As of May 2018, Savage Arms offers three bolt-action rifles and one semiautomatic rifle chambered in 6mm Creedmoor. As of May 2018, Hornady offers 87-gr Varmint Express, 103-gr Precision Hunter and 108-gr Match ammunition in 6mm Creedmoor. Performance-wise, the 6mm Creedmoor is nearly identical to .243 Winchester, with slightly less powder room but often loaded to slightly higher pressures. However since the cartridge was designed from the outset to better handle longer bullets and rifles are accordingly built with fast twist rates the 6mm Creedmoor will usually give better performance with heavy for caliber bullets than the .243.

The .22 Creedmoor is another even further necked-down version of the 6.5mm Creedmoor using .22 (.224 inch) bullets, lighter than 6 mm bullets with even softer recoil.

Military use
In October 2017, U.S. Special Operations Command (USSOCOM) tested the performance of 7.62×51mm NATO (M118LR long-range 7.62×51mm NATO load), .260 Remington, and 6.5mm Creedmoor cartridges out of SR-25, M110A1, and Mk 20 Sniper Support Rifle (SSR) rifles. Tests showed the .260 Remington and 6.5mm Creedmoor cartridges were similarly accurate and reliable, and the external ballistic behavior was also very-similar. The prevailing attitude is there was more room with the 6.5mm Creedmoor to develop projectiles and loads.

As the two cartridges (7.62×51mm NATO and 6.5 mm Creedmoor) have similar dimensions, the same magazines can be used, and a rifle can be converted with just a barrel change. This led to its adoption and fielding by special operations snipers to replace the 7.62×51mm NATO cartridge in their semi-automatic sniper rifles, planned in early 2019. In response to SOCOM's adoption, Department of Homeland Security also decided to adopt the round. U.S. Special Operations Command will convert their 7.62×51mm NATO M110 Semi-automatic Sniper rifle (SASS) and Mk 20 Sniper Support Rifle (SSR) rifles to 6.5 Creedmoor in 2019, a process that requires just a new barrel. In 2018, USSOCOM announced they would roll-out 6.5 mm Creedmoor in a long-range precision rifle, and use it in a carbine and assault machine-gun. The US Special Operations Forces will use the same caliber for an assault rifle, light machine gun, and sniper rifle. That will give better penetration and terminal ballistics (because of high sectional density and retained energy) while providing longer range precision fire.

At the National Defense Industry Association’s annual Special Operations Forces Industry Conference (SOFIC), beginning May 20, 2019, FN unveiled a prototype of its Mk 48 Mod 2 machine gun chambered in 6.5 mm Creedmoor to fill a USSOCOM requirement. American special operations forces are in the process of acquiring a lightweight belt-fed machine gun offering a better range than existing weapons. 6.5 Creedmoor has since received the designation of XM1200.

In November 2019, the U.S. Navy ordered 6.5mm Creedmoor conversion kits to upgrade the M110 Semi-Automatic Sniper System to the M110K1 variant.

See also 
.30 Remington
6 mm caliber
.276 Pedersen
.277 Fury
6.8mm Remington SPC
6.5mm Grendel
6.5×50mmSR Arisaka
6.5×52mm Carcano
6.5×55mm Swedish
List of firearms
List of rifle cartridges
Table of handgun and rifle cartridges

References

External links 

Shooting and Loading the 6.5mm Creedmoor from American Rifleman.

Pistol and rifle cartridges
Weapons and ammunition introduced in 2008